The Macedonian Stock Exchange (MSE; Macedonian: Македонска берза, Makedonska berza) is the principal stock exchange in the Republic of North Macedonia, located in the capital city of Skopje. It was established in 1995 and the first trading occurred in 1996. The Macedonian Stock Exchange is a member of the Federation of Euro-Asian Stock Exchanges.

Operations

Stock indices
Stock indices at the Macedonian Stock exchange include:

MBI 10 (Macedonian Blue Chip Index)
MBID (Macedonian Stock Exchange Index of publicly held companies)
OMB (Bond Index)

See also
Economy of the Republic of North Macedonia
List of stock exchanges
List of European stock exchanges

References

External links

Economy of North Macedonia
Stock exchanges in Europe